Noora Tulus (born 15 August 1995) is a Finnish ice hockey player and member of the Finnish national team, currently playing in the Swedish Women's Hockey League (SDHL) with Luleå HF/MSSK.

Playing career  

She left Finland to join Luleå HF/MSSK just before their playoff run in the 2015-16 Riksserien season. After scoring eight points in the five remaining regular season games, she added another six points in seven playoff games as Luleå won their first Riksserien championship. After the end of the season, she decided to stay in Luleå and signed an extension with the club.

She scored the game-winning goal in the 2018 Champions Cup, held between Luleå and the NWHL's Isobel Cup champions, the Metropolitan Riveters.

She scored 24 points in 22 games in the 2019-20 season, missing several weeks due to a foot injury, as Luleå returned to the championship finals for the third year in a row before the season was cancelled due to the COVID-19 pandemic in Sweden.

In November 2020, Tulus, with four other Finnish national teams and Luleå teammates, were forced to miss several SDHL games while being quarantined under Finnish law after a national team camp where a player tested positive for COVID-19.

International career 
She made her IIHF World Championship debut at the 2015 IIHF Women's World Championship, not picking up any points in five games. She represented Finland at the 2016 IIHF Women's World Championship and 2017 IIHF Women's World Championship. She scored six points in seven games at the 2019 IIHF Women's World Championship, including two assists at the Miracle in Espoo, as Finland won their first-ever silver medal.

References

External links

1995 births
Living people
Finnish expatriate ice hockey players in Sweden
Finnish women's ice hockey forwards
Ice hockey players at the 2018 Winter Olympics
Ice hockey players at the 2022 Winter Olympics
Medalists at the 2018 Winter Olympics
Medalists at the 2022 Winter Olympics
Olympic bronze medalists for Finland
Olympic ice hockey players of Finland
Olympic medalists in ice hockey
Sportspeople from Vantaa
Luleå HF/MSSK players